The Botswana Federation of Trade Unions (BFTU) is the national trade union federation for Botswana. Founded in 1977, it represents over 90% of all trade unions in the country, including all major unions. The BFTU is currently undertaking a reorganization which will see its 25 affiliates merged and reduced in numbers to 13.

The BFTU is affiliated to the International Trade Union Confederation and the Organization of African Trade Union Unity.

References

 
1977 establishments in Botswana
Organisations based in Gaborone
Trade unions established in 1977